KJLT (970 AM) is a radio station broadcasting a Christian format. Licensed to North Platte, Nebraska, United States, the station serves the North Platte area.  The station is owned by Tri-State Broadcasting Association.

Programming
KJLT airs a variety of Christian Talk and Teaching programming as well as Christian music. Christian Talk and Teaching programs include; Back to the Bible, In Touch with Dr. Charles Stanley, Turning Point with David Jeremiah, Insight for Living with Chuck Swindoll,  Revive Our Hearts with Nancy DeMoss Wolgemuth, Love Worth Finding with Adrian Rogers, and Focus on the Family.

History
The station began broadcasting December 26, 1952, holding the call sign KNBR and was owned by John Townsend. In the mid-1950s, the station's call sign was changed to KJLT, and the station's license was transferred to the Tri-State Broadcasting Association.

Translator
KJLT is also heard on a translator on 95.7 FM in North Platte, Nebraska.

References

External links

JLT
Moody Radio affiliate stations
Radio stations established in 1952
1952 establishments in Nebraska